The Robert Worthington House, also known as Piedmont and Quarry Banks, is an historic house located near Charles Town, West Virginia.  The main house was constructed as an addition in 1784 to the original structure, which dates to circa 1735, built by Robert Worthington, who called the house "Quarry Banks - New Style" after his original home, "Quarry Banks" in England.  Worthington's grandson, Thomas Worthington, eventually became the sixth governor of Ohio.

The Georgian style addition was built by Dr. John Briscoe.  The house remains in the Briscoe family.

References

External links 

Houses on the National Register of Historic Places in West Virginia
Worthington, Robert
Georgian architecture in West Virginia
Houses completed in 1735
Houses completed in 1781
National Register of Historic Places in Jefferson County, West Virginia
Colonial architecture in West Virginia